Richard F. Larsen (born August 12, 1936) is an American politician who served as the 30th Lieutenant Governor of North Dakota from 1969 to 1973 under Governor William L. Guy. Larsen also served in the North Dakota House from 1965 to 1966 and the North Dakota Senate from 1967 to 1968.

Early life and education 
Larsen was born in Grand Forks, North Dakota in 1936, the son of Ralph and Ella (née Lundby) Larsen. He attended Harvard University, where earned a Bachelor of Arts degree in economics, graduating cum laude in 1960. He then earned a PhD in economics from the London School of Economics in 1963.

Career 
Larsen was a professor of economics and business at the University of North Dakota from 1963 to 1965, Moorhead State University from 1965 to 1967, and an instructor at the North Dakota University Graduate School of Industrial Management. In 1973, Larsen was appointed by United States Secretary of the Treasury George Shultz to serve as Deputy Assistant Secretary for Developing Nations Finance in the Office of the Under Secretary of the Treasury for International Affairs.

Notes

Lieutenant Governors of North Dakota
Living people
1936 births
Republican Party members of the North Dakota House of Representatives
Republican Party North Dakota state senators
University of North Dakota faculty
Alumni of the London School of Economics
Harvard College alumni
Minnesota State University Moorhead faculty
20th-century American politicians